Bai Jinshi (born May 18, 1999) is a Chinese chess player. He was awarded the title Grandmaster (GM) by FIDE in 2015.

Career 
Born in Jilin, Bai won the Under 10 section of the World Youth Chess Championships in 2009. He played for China A team in the World Youth U16 Chess Olympiad in 2013. Bai won the London Chess Classic Open (jointly with Kamil Dragun) in 2014, the Cannes Open and the Groningen Chess Festival (on tiebreak from Sergei Tiviakov) in 2016. In April 2018, he finished tied for first place with Wen Yang in the Chinese Chess Championship and ended in second place on tiebreak score. In December, he won the North American Open in Las Vegas, US. In the same year, Bai played for the Chinese team in the China-Russia match, the Asian Nations Cup, where China won the bronze medal, and the India-China Summit match. In March 2019, Bai won the Spring Chess Classic B tournament in St Louis, US.

References

External links

Jinshi Bai chess games at 365Chess.com
Bai Jinshi team chess record at Olimpbase.org

1999 births
Living people
Chess grandmasters
World Youth Chess Champions
Chess players from Jilin